The Mangmoom Card (Thai for "spider") is a planned stored-value card for rapid transit systems in Bangkok. Currently, many commuters carry multiple cards, since the existing Rabbit Card only works on the BTS Skytrain and Bangkok BRT, while the MRT Plus card works on the MRT Blue Line and MRT Purple Line. The card was initially planned to launch in August 2016 but was delayed until at least 2018 as the Office of Transport and Traffic Policy and Planning required more time to integrate the ticketing systems of the different rail networks. In November 2016, Transport Minister Arkhom Termpittayapaisith announced the card would be available to use on the Skytrain, MRT, and Airport Rail Link by the middle of 2017. 

In April 2017, it was announced that the MRTA would act as a central clearing house for the ticketing system, with the Airport Rail Link and some electric rail services joining by mid-2017, buses and the MRT Purple line joining by October 2017, and the BTS Skytrain and MRT Blue Line later. In October 2017, it was announced that the card was again delayed to mid-2018 and will only work with buses and the Airport Rail Link at launch.

In June 2018, it was announced the card would finally launch on the 23rd of that month, with 200,000 cards issued to the public, and would only work on the MRT Blue Line and MRT Purple Line at launch, with the Airport Rail Link to be added by October. 

In September 2018, it was announced that compatibility with the Airport Rail Link would be delayed until the end of 2018, and BMTA buses would be delayed until March 2019.

See also 
 Electronic money
 List of smart cards

References 

Contactless smart cards
Transport in Bangkok